Georges Vestris (born 8 June 1959 in Fort-de-France, Martinique) is a French basketball player. Vestris has had 157 selections on the French national men's basketball team from 1979-1991 .

References 
 sports reference federation francaise de basket-ball

1959 births
Living people
Sportspeople from Fort-de-France
Martiniquais men's basketball players
Basketball players at the 1984 Summer Olympics
BCM Gravelines players
Élan Béarnais players
French men's basketball players
French people of Martiniquais descent
Limoges CSP players
Olympic basketball players of France
1986 FIBA World Championship players